Fazeel Najeeb is former governor of the Maldives Monetary Authority (2008-2013) where he is also the Chairman of the Board of Directors. A native of Fuvahmulah, Fazeel is also the Governor of Maldives to the International Monetary Fund, and the current Chairman of SAARC Finance, a network of Central Banks in South Asia. He began his public service in 1987 at the Ministry of Trade and Industry. He also had his own consulting firm, before taking up his doctoral studies in London. He assumed office at Maldives Monetary Authority in 2008.

Fazeel holds a PhD in Commercial Law (Intellectual Property), an LLM in International Business Law, and a BA Honours degree in Economics. He acquired education from the United Kingdom.

After assuming the office of the Governor of MMA, in 2009 Fazeel introduced the first prudential regulations for banks in the Maldives – a set of 11 prudential regulations. In the same year he also proposed to the government, the first banking act of Maldives and introduced the first ever monetary policy framework and operations at the Central Bank, and, simultaneously introduced the auctioning of treasury bills.

References

Governors of Maldives Monetary Authority
Maldivian economists
Living people
Year of birth missing (living people)